Michelangelo Arena (born 2 September 1953) is a former Italian male long-distance runner who competed at one edition of the IAAF World Cross Country Championships at senior level (1978), He won two national championships at senior level.

References

External links
 

1953 births
Living people
Italian male long-distance runners
Italian male marathon runners
Italian male cross country runners